Nary Thapa is a left-handed batter for the Nepali National Cricket team.

International career
Thapa made her international debut in January-2019 against China at the Thailand Women's T20 Smash tournament.  She also represented Nepal in the 2019 ICC Women's Qualifier Asia in Bangkok, Thailand. This tournament was an Asia region qualifier for the 2019 ICC Women's World Twenty20 Qualifier as well as the 2020 Women's Cricket World Cup Qualifier tournaments, with the top team progressing to both of them. During the tournament, she took her first five-wicket haul in WT20Is. She was the joint-leading wicket-taker in the 2019 ICC Women's Qualifier Asia tournament, with thirteen dismissals in six matches.

References

1992 births
Living people
Nepalese women cricketers
Cricketers at the 2010 Asian Games
Cricketers at the 2014 Asian Games
Asian Games competitors for Nepal
Nepal women Twenty20 International cricketers